Paul McKillen is an  Irish former sportsperson from Ballycastle, County Antrim. He played hurling with the Antrim senior inter-county team and won an All Star award in 1993, being picked in midfield.

References

External links
GAA Info Profile

Living people
Antrim inter-county hurlers
Ballycastle McQuillan hurlers
Ulster inter-provincial hurlers
Year of birth missing (living people)